Carabao discography is a discography for Thai rock band Carabao.

Studio albums
There are 27 official studio albums, released from 1981 to 2013.

Special Albums
 2003 - เมดอินไทยแลนด์ ภาค 2546 สังคายนา - Made in Thailand Paak 2546 Sang-Kai-Na - Made in Thailand Version 2003
 2004 - ชุด โฟล์ค 'บาว - Folk Bao. 12 hits, CD + Karaoke-VCD, acoustic version, with Aed, Lek, Thierry. Dec. 2004
 2005 - หนุ่มบาว–สาวปาน - Num Bao-Sao Parn - Young Man Bao, Young Woman Parn. With guest singer Parn Thanaporn (RS Promotion)
 2007 - Ruam Hit 25 Pee - Bao Benjapes. 25 songs + 5 bonus tracks. 2 CDs. The 25 Years Anniversary Compilation (Nov. 2007).
 2007 - Carabao & Parn - ชุด หนุ่มบาว-สาวปาน สมานฉันท์ 1'000'000 + Copies Celebration Noom Bao, Sao Parn. 14 tracks, CD + Karaoke-VCD, 19 Dec. 2007 (RS)
 2008 - Carabao & Parn - อัลบั้ม หนุ่มบาว Noom Bao - new version! 12 songs, CD + Karaoke-VCD. 20 Feb. 2008. (RS)
 2008 - Carabao - อัลบั้ม หนุ่มบาว Remix - Vol.1, CD + Karaoke-VCD, Hip-Hop, Dance, R&B, 10 Tracks. 8 April 2008.
 2008 - Carabao 3-Cha - คา ราบาว 3 ช่า รอบ นี้ ผี บ้า รอบ หน้า ผี บอก Rop Nii Pii Baa Rop Naa Pii Bok . CD + Karaoke-VCD - 13 tracks, 27 Nov. 2008.
 2009 - Carabao - Hip Hop & Dance - Vol.1, CD + Karaoke-VCD + MD, 10 Tracks (e.g.: "Mae Sai" in Dance, "Duen Penn" in R&B, "Talae Jai", "Surachai 3-Cha in Dance, etc.). Jan. 2009
 2009 - Carabao - Hip Hop & Dance - Vol.2, CD + Karaoke-VCD + MD, 10 tracks (e.g.: "Rak Torrahod" in Hip-Hop, "Khon Jon Poo Ying Yai", " Wicha Pae", "Wanipok", "Bua Loy" in Dance, etc.) Jan. 2009
 2009 - Carabao & Parn Thanaporn - Bao Parn Return (RS - Dec. 2009)

Live albums
 2008 - The Diary of Carabao, concert on 16 February 2008 at Bonanza Ranch Khao Yai, Pak Chong, Nakhon Ratchasima
 2009 - 3 ช่าสามัคคี ตอน ลูกทุ่งแฟนตาเชีย - 3 Cha Saamakkhee Luk Thung Fantasia - Cha-Cha-Cha in union with Luk Thung Fantasia, concert on 31 May 2009 at Impact Arena, Muang Thong Thani, Nonthaburi with guest singers of the Thai singing contest show Academy Fantasia and Sek Loso
 2010 - Bao Parn Big Match Concert, concert on 20 March 2010 at Muang Thong Thani Stadium, Nonthaburi. Guests: Thaitanium, Girly Berry, Nattawut Skidjai, Aun Sripan, Pong Lang Sa On
 2013 - เขียว คาราบาว: บันทึกการแสดงสดคอนเสิร์ต 60 ปี - Kiew Carabao - 60th Anniversary Concert, concert on 5 May 2013 at Chalermkrung Theatre, Bangkok. Guests: Hope, Seepuek Khondarnkwien, Pao Barabao
 2014 - Rock Never Dies ควาย Ever Dance - Rock Never Dies Kwai Ever Dance, concert on 9 November 2013 in Sattahip, Chonburi. Guests: Laem Morrison, Olarn Promjai, Kitti, Sek Loso, Kotee Aramboy

Selected Compilations

Solo Albums (Aed Carabao) 

Carabao (band) albums
Discographies of Thai artists
Rock music group discographies